Ibrahim Shaheen, and Inshirah Moussa were an Egyptian couple who worked for the Israeli intelligence service Mossad from 1967 until their arrest in 1974. Shaheen was executed in Egypt in 1977, while his wife and 3 children fled to Israel and converted to Judaism. In Israel Inshirah changed her name to Dina Ben David. She died in 2021 in Tel Aviv, where her funeral ceremonies were held according to the Jewish religion. Their case was widely publicized in the Israeli media in the 1980s.

See also
 Refaat Al-Gammal
 Gumaa Al-Shawan
 Heba Selim

References

1929 births
1977 deaths
Converts to Judaism from Islam
20th-century Israeli Jews
Israeli people of Egyptian descent
Egyptian people convicted of spying for Israel
Executed spies
Israeli Arab Jews
Married couples